Atanas Atanassov Paparizov (born 5 July 1951 in Sofia) is a Bulgarian politician and Member of the European Parliament. He is a member of the Coalition for Bulgaria, part of the Party of European Socialists, and became an MEP on 1 January 2007 with the accession of Bulgaria to the European Union.

External links
 European Parliament profile
 European Parliament official photo

1951 births
Living people
Moscow State Institute of International Relations alumni
Coalition for Bulgaria MEPs
MEPs for Bulgaria 2007
MEPs for Bulgaria 2007–2009